The Société de Géographie, is the world's oldest geographical society. It was founded in 1821 as the first Geographic Society. Since 1878, its headquarters have been at 184 Boulevard Saint-Germain, Paris. The entrance is marked by two gigantic caryatids representing Land and Sea. It was here, in 1879, that the construction of the Panama Canal was decided.

History
The Geographical Society was founded at a meeting on 15 December 1821 in the Paris Hôtel de Ville. Among its 217 founders were some of the greatest scientific names of the time, including Pierre-Simon Laplace (the Society's first president), Georges Cuvier, Charles Pierre Chapsal, Vivant Denon, Joseph Fourier, Gay-Lussac, Claude Louis Berthollet, Alexander von Humboldt, Champollion, and François-René de Chateaubriand. Most of the men who had accompanied Bonaparte in his Egyptian expedition were members: Edme-François Jomard, Conrad Malte-Brun, Jules Dumont d'Urville, Jules Paul Benjamin Delessert, Hottinguer, Henri Didot, Bottin and others such as Jean-Baptiste Benoît Eyriès.

Although the Society rarely funded scientific travel, by issuing instructions to voyagers, encouraging research through competitions, and publishing the results of their work, it served in its early years as "an important institutional support" for the study of Mesoamerica. Two members in the "active core" of the society played central roles in this regard: Jomard and the Irish exile David Ballie Warden. Their terms for a competition for the best new work on "American antiquities", including maps  "constructed according to exact methods" and "observations on the mores and customs of the indigenous peoples, and vocabularies of the ancient languages." extended decades-old scientific practices to a new field of anthropological inquiry. 

The society was to be associated in time with the greatest French and foreign explorers from René Caillié, the first European to return alive from the town of Timbuktu, to the underwater explorer Jacques Cousteau, and leading geographers, among them Vidal de la Blache, founder of the French School of Geopolitics.  

The Society was the location of the Arab Congress of 1913, which took place from June 18 to June 23 of that year and marked the confluence of events surrounding the decline of the Ottoman Empire, the beginnings of Arab nationalism, and early Arab reaction to Zionist immigration to Palestine.

Publications
The Society's revue has appeared monthly since 1822, as Bulletin de la Société de Géographie (1822–1899) – offering in octavo format early news of all the discoveries of the nineteenth century – or quarterly, as La Géographie, with a break from 1940 until 1946. Since 1947 the Society's magazine has appeared three times a year, as Acta Geographica. 

The Society's library, map collection and photograph collection are among the world's deepest and most comprehensive.

List of presidents

Awards

Grande Médaille d'Or des Explorations
The Grande Médaille d'Or des Explorations et Voyages de Découverte (Great Gold Medal of Exploration and Journeys of Discovery) has been awarded since 1829 for journeys whose outcomes have enhanced geographical knowledge. Notable recipients have been John Franklin (1829), John Ross (1834), David Livingstone (1857), Ernest Shackleton (1910) and Roald Amundsen (1913).

Notes

References
Société de Géographie official site (in French)

External links 
 La Géographie : bulletin de la Société de géographie dans Gallica, la bibliothèque numérique de la BnF.

History of geography
Science and technology in France
1821 establishments in France
Organizations based in Paris
Geographic societies
Learned societies of France

ar:جمعية جغرافية